Richmond most often refers to:
 Richmond, Virginia, the capital of Virginia, United States
 Richmond, London, a part of London
 Richmond, North Yorkshire, a town in England
 Richmond, British Columbia, a city in Canada
 Richmond, California, a city in California, United States

Richmond may also refer to:

People
 Richmond (surname)
 Earl of Richmond
 Duke of Richmond
 Richmond C. Beatty (1905–1961), American academic, biographer and critic
 Richmond Avenal, character in British sitcom The IT Crowd

Places

Australia
 Richmond, New South Wales
 RAAF Base Richmond
 Richmond Woodlands Important Bird Area
 Richmond River, New South Wales
Division of Richmond
Electoral district of Richmond (New South Wales)
 Richmond, Queensland
 Richmond, South Australia
 Richmond, Tasmania
 Richmond, Victoria
 Electoral district of Richmond (Victoria)
 City of Richmond

Canada
 Richmond, British Columbia, a city in Metro Vancouver
 Richmond (British Columbia provincial electoral district)
 Richmond, Calgary, Alberta, a neighbourhood
 Richmond Parish, New Brunswick
 Richmond, Nova Scotia
  Richmond (Nova Scotia federal electoral district)
 Richmond (Nova Scotia provincial electoral district)
 Richmond, Ontario, a community part of the city of Ottawa
 Richmond, Prince Edward Island
 Richmond, Quebec
 Richmond (Quebec provincial electoral district)

Germany
 Schloss Richmond, a castle in Brunswick

Ireland
 Richmond, County Tipperary, a townland in north County Tipperary
 Richmond Park (football ground), Dublin

Jamaica
 Richmond, Jamaica

New Zealand 
 Richmond, New Zealand, a town in the Tasman district in South Island
 Richmond, Canterbury, a small suburb in Christchurch, South Island
 Richmond, Invercargill, a minor suburb, South Island

South Africa
 Richmond, Northern Cape
 Richmond, KwaZulu-Natal

United Kingdom
 Richmond, London, previously known as Shene, a town formerly in Surrey and now in the London Borough of Richmond upon Thames
 The London Borough of Richmond upon Thames, colloquially known as Richmond borough
 Richmond station
 Richmond Hill, London
 Museum of Richmond in Richmond, London
 Richmond Palace, previously known as Shene Palace
Richmond Park in the London Borough of Richmond upon Thames
 Richmond, The American International University in London
 Municipal Borough of Richmond (Surrey) (1890 to 1965)
 Richmond (Surrey) (UK Parliament constituency), 1918–1983
 Richmond, North Yorkshire, a market town and the administrative centre of the district of Richmondshire
 Richmond Castle in Richmond, North Yorkshire
 Honour of Richmond, an English feudal barony in north-west Yorkshire 
 Richmond (Yorks) (UK Parliament constituency), 1885–present
 Richmonds in the Wood, Thaxted, Essex 
 Richmond, Sheffield, an area of Sheffield, South Yorkshire

United States
 Richmond, Alabama, an unincorporated community
 Richmond, Arkansas, an unincorporated community
 Richmond, California
Richmond station (California)
 Richmond District, San Francisco, California
 Richmond County, Georgia, a county
 Richmond, Illinois, a town
 Richmond, Indiana
 Richmond, Kansas
 Richmond, Kentucky
 Richmond, Louisiana, a village
 Richmond, Maine, a New England town
 Richmond (CDP), Maine, village within the town
 Richmond, Massachusetts
 Richmond, Michigan, in Macomb County
 New Richmond, Michigan, in Allegan County
 Richmond, Minnesota
 Richmond, Missouri
 Richmond, New Hampshire
 Richmond, New York, a town
 Richmond County, North Carolina, a county
 Richmond, Ohio
 Richmond, Oregon, a town
 Richmond, Portland, Oregon, a neighborhood
 Richmond, Rhode Island
 Richmond, Texas
 Richmond, Utah
 Richmond, Vermont, a New England town
 Richmond (CDP), Vermont, village within the town
 Richmond, Virginia, the state's capital city
Richmond Raceway
University of Richmond
 Richmond, Shawano County, Wisconsin, a town
 Richmond, St. Croix County, Wisconsin, a town
 Richmond, Walworth County, Wisconsin, a town
 Richmond (community), Wisconsin, an unincorporated community

Bodies of water 
 Richmond Creek (disambiguation)
 Richmond River, New South Wales, Australia
 Richmond River (St. Vincent)

Ships
 Richmond (1811 ship), wrecked in 1822 in the Sea of Java
 HMS Richmond, several ships in the British Navy
 USS Richmond, several ships in the United States Navy

Sports clubs 
 Richmond Football Club, Australia
 Richmond F.C., England

Other uses
 Confitería Richmond, a former tea room and literary café in Buenos Aires, Argentina
 Richmond (automobile), cars built in Richmond, Indiana, United States
 Richmond (cigarette)
 Richmond Herald, in England, an officer of arms
 Richmond (Natchez, Mississippi), a historic mansion built in 1810

See also 

 Richmond Bridge (disambiguation)
 Richmond College (disambiguation)
 Richmond County (disambiguation)
 Richmond Hill (disambiguation)
 Richmond Oval (disambiguation)
 Richmond Park (disambiguation)
 Richmond Station (disambiguation)
 Richmond Township (disambiguation)
 Borough of Richmond (disambiguation)
 New Richmond (disambiguation)
 
 Richemont (disambiguation)
 Richmound, Saskatchewan